În fiecare zi Dumnezeu ne sărută pe gură (Everyday God Kisses Us On The Mouth) is a 2001 Romanian film directed by Sinișa Dragin and starring Ana Ciontea, Dan Condurache and Horațiu Mălăele.

Cast
 Dan Condurache as Dumitru
 Ana Ciontea as Dumitru's Wife
 Antoaneta Zaharia	
 Horațiu Mălăele as Milicia Officer
 Dan Aștilean as Dumitru's Brother
 Valer Dellakeza	
 Cristina Tacoi	
 Carmen Ungureanu	
 Mirela Gorea	
 George Alexandru	
 Alexandru Bindea	
 Tania Popa	
 Elena Alexe
 Vicențiu Baniasz	
 Mihai Brătilă	
 Nicolae Bunea	
 George Buznea	
 Gabriel Costea	
 Gheorghe Crăciunescu	
 Dobre Crăciun	
 Constantin Drăgănescu	
 Elena Drăghici	
 Mihail Dumitrescu	
 Constantin Fărâmiță
 Constantin Ghiniță	
 Doinița Ghițescu	
 Marius Goicea	
 Dobrin Grigorescu	
 Carol Gruber	
 Anica Gruianu	
 Cosmin Șofron as The Thief 
 Gabriel Spahiu as The Gambler

References

External links

 

2001 films
2000s Romanian-language films
Films directed by Sinișa Dragin
Romanian drama films